Imperial College Boat Club is the rowing club for Imperial College and has its boat house on the River Thames on the Putney embankment, London, United Kingdom. It was founded in 1919. The alumni also run a boat club which is known as the Queen's Tower Boat Club and both crews occasionally row together as a composite in competition.

History
The boat club was housed from 1919 in Thames Rowing Club but has had its own boathouse since 1938.

The club has been successful in competitions, with many wins at Henley Royal Regatta including in 2013 with victory in The Prince Albert Challenge Cup event. The club has been home to numerous National Squad oarsmen and women and is open to all rowers not just students of Imperial College London.

The Gold medal winning GB 8+ at the 2000 Sydney Olympics had been based at Imperial College's recently refurbished boathouse and included 3 alumni of the college along with their coach Martin McElroy.

Coaching
The most well-known of Imperial College Boat Club's coaches is Bill Mason. Bill is a former Olympic oarsman himself and for many years was head coach and director of rowing at Imperial College Boat Club. In that time he was responsible for numerous Henley Royal Regatta and Henley Women's Regatta wins. He coached athletes at the club from novices up to international and developed the club substantially during his time in charge.

Until 2008, the head coach was Simon Cox who, after taking over from Simon Dennis in 2005, went on to coach the Henley Royal Regatta winning crew in 2006, before taking up a position with Swiss Rowing. His replacement was Olympic Gold Medallist Steve Trapmore who coached the club until September 2010, when he moved on to coach Cambridge University Boat Club. Don McLachlan took over from 2010 until leaving in April 2013 to become lead coach at Rowing Ireland, just before the club won Henley Royal Regatta again a few months later.

Major event wins and international competition

See also

 University rowing (UK)
 Rowing on the River Thames

References

External links
 Imperial College London Boat Club
 IC Empire (archive from 2001–2003)

1919 establishments in England
Sports clubs established in 1919
Clubs and societies of Imperial College London
Tideway Rowing clubs
Boathouses in the United Kingdom
University and college rowing clubs in the United Kingdom
Rowing clubs of the River Thames
Student sport in London